Harry Matthew Pinchard (born 11 September 2001) is a Welsh footballer who plays as a midfielder for National League North club Hereford.

Career

Cardiff City 
Born in Chepstow, Wales, Pinchard joined Cardiff City's youth academy aged 9. He was released by Cardiff City in 2020.

Upon his release from Cardiff City, Pinchard had a two-week trial with Manchester City.

Hereford 
On 18 August 2021, Pinchard signed for National League North club Hereford after a successful trial period. On 15 October 2022, Pinchard scored a free-kick in a 2–1 win at Bromley to help send Hereford into the first round proper of the FA Cup for the second time in their history.

Career statistics

References

External links 

 Harry Pinchard profile at the Hereford F.C. website
 
 

2001 births
Living people
People from Chepstow
Sportspeople from Monmouthshire
Welsh footballers
Association football midfielders
Hereford F.C. players
National League (English football) players